Georg Wiegner (April 20, 1883 – April 14, 1936) was a colloid chemist. He was born in Leipzig and died in Zurich.

Georg Wiegner studied natural sciences at the University of Leipzig, and received a doctorate in 1906. He was an assistant to Wilhelm Fleischmann at the University of Göttingen from 1907. He was appointed professor of agricultural chemistry at the ETH Zurich in 1913, where he remained until the year of his death, in 1933. He was responsible for seminal discoveries in coagulation and ion exchange. His group at the ETH strongly influenced ecological pedology in Switzerland. The group who worked with him included Hermann Gessner (1897–1981), Hans Jenny (1899–1992) and Hans Pallmann (1903–1965). His group also influenced the work of  Max Düggeli, who had a major influence on soil biology in Switzerland.

Works 
 Boden und Bodenbildung Kolloidchemischer Betrachtung, 1918
 Anleitung zum quantitativischen agrikulturchemischen Praktikum, 1919

References

1883 births
1936 deaths
20th-century German chemists
German soil scientists
Scientists from Göttingen
Academic staff of ETH Zurich
Leipzig University alumni
Academic staff of the University of Göttingen
Colloid chemists